Dutağaç can refer to:

 Dutağaç, Bozdoğan
 Dutağaç, Çankırı